Aditi Sunil Tatkare is an Indian politician belonging to Nationalist Congress Party, who she was State Minister of Maharashtra By Thakarey Government 2019 - 2022. She is from Roha and She was elected as a member of the Maharashtra Legislative Assembly from Shrivardhan on 24 October 2019. She took the oath as an MLA on 26 November 2019.

Positions held
2017 - 2019 President Raigad zhila Parishad
2019 - Elect Member of Maharashtra Legislative Assembly from Shrivardhan Assembly constituency
30 December 2019 - 29 June 2022 Appoint Minister of State Government of Maharashtra 
Department
Law and Judiciary
Industries. 
Mining Department.
Tourism.
Horticulture
Sports and Youth Welfare
Protocol
Information and Public Relations
2020 - 2022 Guardian minister of Raigad District Government of Maharashtra
27 June 2022 - 29 June 2022 Appoint Minister of State Government of Maharashtra 
Department
Ports DevelopmentAdditional charge on 27 June 2022
Khar land DevelopmentAdditional charge on 27 June 2022
Special AssistanceAdditional charge on 27 June 2022
Cultural AffairsAdditional charge on 27 June 2022
School EducationAdditional charge on 27 June 2022

References

Living people
Nationalist Congress Party politicians from Maharashtra
People from Raigad district
Maharashtra MLAs 2019–2024
Year of birth missing (living people)
21st-century Indian women politicians
Women members of the Maharashtra Legislative Assembly